Fritwell & Somerton railway station was on the  to  line of the Great Western Railway, and was opened four years after the line, in September 1854. It was in the village of Somerton, Oxfordshire.

History

The line had been authorised as the Oxford and Rugby Railway, but had been absorbed by the GWR prior to its opening on 2 September 1850.

It was soon decided that Somerton needed a station. It was built south of the railway bridge in the village, and opened in 1855, being originally named Somerton.

The goods service was withdrawn on 4 May 1964, and the passenger service ceased on 2 November 1964.

Route

Notes

References

Disused railway stations in Oxfordshire
Former Great Western Railway stations
Railway stations in Great Britain opened in 1855
Railway stations in Great Britain closed in 1964
Beeching closures in England